Sexorcism is the ninth studio album by the Finnish rock band Lordi. It was released on 25 May 2018 via AFM Records. The album has been described as possibly their most controversial record to date, and a "full-on and uncensored shot of Lordi brand hard rock and roll".

It is the final studio album to feature longtime member OX on bass guitar.

Track listing

Personnel 
All information from the album booklet.

Lordi
 Mr Lordi – lead and backing vocals, songwriting, lyrics, artwork, cover, layout
 Amen – guitars, backing vocals, songwriting
 OX – bass, songwriting
 Mana – drums, backing vocals, songwriting, recording
 Hella – keyboards, songwriting

Additional musicians
 Netta Laurenne – backing vocals
 Isabella Larsson – acapella vocals on "Polterchrist"
 Tracy Lipp – backing vocals, recording, lyrics
 Dylan Broda – backing vocals
 Jessica Love – backing vocals
 Ralph Ruiz – backing vocals, lyrics on "SCG9: The Documented Phenomenon"
 Tom Roine – backing vocals

Production
 Mikko Karmila – producer, recording, mixing
 Mika Jussila – mastering
 Eero Kokko – photography

Charts

References 

2018 albums
Lordi albums
AFM Records albums